Cangzhou West railway station is a high-speed railway station in Cangzhou, Hebei. It is served by some trains on the Beijing–Shanghai high-speed railway.

Platforms 1 and 2 are used for trains to Jinan, Qingdao and Shanghai Hongqiao; platforms 3 and 4 are used for services to Beijing South and Tianjin West. Two tracks in the middle of the station allow for trains running direct services to continue at full speed without stopping.

The ticket office, station concourse and station square are all to the east of the station.

Railway stations in Hebei
Railway stations in China opened in 2011